Your Money or Your Wife is a 1960 British comedy film directed by Anthony Simmons and starring Donald Sinden, Peggy Cummins, and Richard Wattis. In this farce, a couple must divorce in order to inherit a fortune.

Cast
 Donald Sinden as Pelham Butterworth
 Peggy Cummins as Gay Butterworth
 Richard Wattis as Hubert Fry
 Peter Reynolds as Theodore Malek
 Georgina Cookson as Thelma Cressingdon
 Gladys Boot as Mrs. Compton Chamberlain
 Barbara Steele as Juliet Frost
 Betty Baskcomb as Janet Fry
 Olive Sloane as Mrs. Withers
 Ian Fleming as The judge
 Candy Scott as The maid
 Noel Tregarthen as The chauffeur

Production
Donald Sinden recalled the film in his memoirs:
Oh dear. Unfortunately it was made on the cheap and little care had been taken turning a script, intended to be played in one permanent setting, into a film. It was merely chopped into sections: one to be played in the living room, another in the bedroom, the next in the garage, the next in the kitchen. This left endless shots of actors walking in silence from one place to another before continuing the dialogue. As someone wisely pointed out, a movie means that the action should move — not the camera.

Release
Your Money or Your Wife was released in March 1960 in Great Britain. Originally written as the play 'Count Your Blessings' by Ronald Jeans. First performed at Wyndhams Theatre London March 7, 1951.

Critical reception
In the Radio Times, David Parkinson gave the film one out of five stars, and wrote, "Nice title, shame about the movie...Both screenwriter Ronald Jeans and director Anthony Simmons seemed to think that an abundance of slapstick, a little innuendo and bags of mugging would be enough to have the audience in convulsions."

References

External links

1960 films
1960s English-language films
Films directed by Anthony Simmons
1960 comedy films
British comedy films
Films set in London
1960s British films